Jorge Astiazarán Orcí is a Mexican politician, member of the Institutional Revolutionary Party and was the 23rd Mayor of Tijuana.

Life before politics
Born in Los Angeles, California to an elite family, Astiazarán was born in the United States when his mother was visiting her father, who was a Mexican Consul in Los Angeles. His father was an accountant and started a chain of radio stations called Grupo Uniradio. Astiazaran's family first moved to Tijuana in the 1940s from the neighboring state of Sonora.

References

1962 births
Living people
Municipal presidents of Tijuana
Institutional Revolutionary Party politicians
Politicians from Los Angeles
21st-century Mexican politicians
Politicians from Tijuana